Table Island may refer to:
Table Island, Canadian Arctic Archipelago
Table Island (Coco Islands)
Table Island (Tsing Chau), an island of Hong Kong
Table Island (South Shetland Islands)